Maja e Vjelakut (Volujak) is a peak of the Prokletije range in Kosovo, reaching a top height of . Volujak creates part of the Rugova Canyon. This mountain can be seen from the city of Peja because it is only a few kilometers west of it.

Notes

References 

Geography of Peja District
Mountains of Kosovo
Accursed Mountains
Two-thousanders of Kosovo